Turbasly (Turbaślı) is a rural locality (a selo) and the administrative centre of Turbaslinsky Selsoviet, Iglinsky District, Bashkortostan, Russia. The population was 419 as of 2010. There are 9 streets. The selo is located close to the centre of Bashkortostan.

Geography 
Turbasly is located 34 km southwest of Iglino (the district's administrative centre) by road. Bibakhtino is the nearest rural locality.

Tourist attractions 
There are no tourist attractions in Turbasly.

References 

Rural localities in Iglinsky District